Ojiya can refer to: 
 Ojiya, Niigata 
 Ojiya, another name for zosui, a mild Japanese rice soup